Priory Meadows, Hickling is a  biological Site of Special Scientific Interest south-east of North Walsham in Norfolk. It is part of the Broadland Ramsar site and Special Protection Area, and The Broads Special Area of Conservation.

This grassland on damp and acidic peat soil is managed traditionally, and it has a rich and diverse flora with herbs such as tormentil and marsh cinquefoil. There is also a network of dykes with aquatic plants.

References

Sites of Special Scientific Interest in Norfolk
Hickling, Norfolk